"Over at the Frankenstein Place" is the third song in the cult musical The Rocky Horror Show, sung outside Dr. Frank N. Furter's castle in the rain in the 1975 cult film.  The song is in the key of E major.

Release 

"Over at the Frankenstein Place" is the third song in the cult musical The Rocky Horror Show. The 1975 cult film includes the song being sung outside Dr. Frank N. Furter's castle in the rain, performed in the key of E major by Susan Sarandon (Janet), Barry Bostwick (Brad), and Richard O'Brien (Riff Raff). In the original Rocky Horror Show, Brad had a verse to himself (beginning "I can see the flag fly"). This was cut for the movie—otherwise it would appear right when Brad and Janet dodge out of the way of the motorcyclists. The karaoke version of the track found on the "Rocky Horror Picture Show: Sing It" album has space for this extra verse, despite sticking to the movie's music for the rest of the album. In the 2000 revival for Broadway, it was performed by Alice Ripley, Jarrod Emick, and Raúl Esparza. The revival retained the verse that was cut from the film, but which is present in all licensed stage productions of the show.

On the Rocky Horror Picture Show DVD commentary with Richard O'Brien (Riff Raff) and Patricia Quinn (Magenta), O'Brien confessed being extremely nervous during the opening of The Rocky Horror Show. Once he could hear the audience laughing, however, he began to relax.

This was one of the songs sung by O'Brien as he revisited Oakley Court (the castle's location) for VH1's Behind the Music special. O'Brien sings Janet's verse before describing how the song was, and how the camera would tilt up to a 'very handsome chap', then O'Brien proceeded to sing his verse. O'Brien also sung the song in an acoustic style as an extra for the Rocky Interactive Horror Show PC Game.

Songs about Frankenstein's monster
1975 songs
1970s ballads
Pop ballads
Songs from Rocky Horror
Songs written for films
Songs with lyrics by Richard O'Brien
Songs with music by Richard Hartley (composer)
Vocal collaborations
Victoria Justice songs